The 1977 Macdonald Lassies Championship, the Canadian women's curling championship was held February 27 to March 4, 1977, at the Saint Mary's Arena in Halifax, Nova Scotia. The event would see the first appearance for the Northwest Territories/Yukon region.

Team Alberta, who was skipped by Myrna McQuarrie won the event by finishing the round robin with a 9–1 record. This was Alberta's third championship and first since .

Teams
The teams are listed as follows:

Round Robin Standings
Final round robin standings

References

External links
Coverage on CurlingZone

Scotties Tournament of Hearts
Macdonald Lassies
Curling competitions in Halifax, Nova Scotia
1977 in Nova Scotia
February 1977 sports events in Canada
March 1977 sports events in Canada
1977 in women's curling